The following is a list of the national roads in Uganda, which are under the jurisdiction of the Uganda National Roads Authority. The list is not exhaustive.

National roads

See also
 Economy of Uganda
 Transport in Uganda
Kinshasa Highway

References

External links
UNRA, World Bank in talks to resume road funding
Uganda’s Road Network Has Improved Significantly - 12 February 2013

Roads in Uganda
Uganda
Roads
Roads